Pam Eddinger is the seventh president of the Bunker Hill Community College in Massachusetts, United States. Eddinger is the first Chinese-American President in the Massachusetts Community College System.

Early life 
Eddinger was born as Pam Yue in Hong Kong. Eddinger's ancestry is Chinese. At age 11, Eddinger emigrated to Miami, Florida. Eddinger's mother was a seamstress. Eddinger's father was a waiter. Eddinger has a sister and a brother. Eddinger attended Miami Edison Senior High School.

Education 
Eddinger earned a BA degree in English from Barnard College in New York City in 1982. Shen then earned a MA and a PhD in modern Japanese literature from Columbia University.

Career
Eddinger has served community colleges since 1993 in various leadership roles, including instruction, student services, marketing, institutional advancement and legislative relations. She also served as adjunct lecturer at Boston University in modern Japanese literature.

In 2002, Eddinger became the vice president of academic affairs and the dean of the faculty at Massachusetts Bay Community College, a position that she held until 2004. She served as the executive vice president from 2004 until 2005.

Eddinger became the executive vice president of Moorpark College in Moorpark, California. She served as the president of the community college from 2008 to 2013.

On July 1, 2013, Eddinger became the 7th president of Bunker Hill Community College in Boston, Massachusetts. Eddinger succeeded Mary L. Fifield, who had retired after 16 years in post. Eddinger is also the first Chinese-American President of the Massachusetts Community College System. Eddinger was honored in 2016 by the Obama White House as a Champion of Change.

Personal life 
Eddinger's husband was James Eddinger.

References

External links 
 Pam Eddinger at Bloomberg.com
 Pam Eddinger at forum-network.org
 Archive Collection: Presidents

Living people
Heads of universities and colleges in the United States
Bunker Hill Community College
Moorpark College
Boston University faculty
Hong Kong emigrants to the United States
Year of birth missing (living people)
Barnard College alumni
Columbia Graduate School of Arts and Sciences alumni